Achatinella pulcherrima is a species of air-breathing land snail, a terrestrial pulmonate gastropod mollusk in the family Achatinellidae. This species is endemic to the island of Oahu in Hawaii.

Henry Augustus Pilsbry considered this species to be a subspecies of Achatinella byronii.

Shell description 
The dextral shell is ovate oblong, subcylindrical and slender. Some specimens are more ventricose than other. The shell has six whorls. The color is white or yellow with none to several broad bands of chestnut. The margin of the lip is brown. The ground color is a deep and rich
chestnut, with from one to three bands of orange, yellow, fulvous or white. The marginal groove to the suture is very close and distinct in all.

The height of the shell is 20.0 mm. The width of the shell is 11.2 mm.

References
This article incorporates public domain text (a public domain work of the United States Government) from reference.

External links

pulcherrima
Molluscs of Hawaii
Endemic fauna of Hawaii
Critically endangered fauna of the United States
Gastropods described in 1828
Taxonomy articles created by Polbot
ESA endangered species